The Dome Event is the twenty-sixth album by Klaus Schulze. It was originally released in 1993. This is the fifth of seven early-1990s Klaus Schulze albums not to be reissued by Revisited Records.

Although released in 1993, The Dome Event is a live concert performed on 11 May 1991 in Germany at the Cologne Cathedral, also called "The Dome". Other musicians were playing that day, including Ash Ra and Blue Chip Orchestra. The album belongs to the "sampling" period of Schulze's. The beginning of the concert can be seen as a collage of samples, especially "ethnical" voices, percussions, instruments. The rest of the concert relies a lot on samples. "After Eleven" was composed in the studio, and is not a piece played during the concert.

Track listing
All tracks composed by Klaus Schulze.

References

External links
 The Dome Event at the official site of Klaus Schulze
 

Albums with cover art by Dave McKean
Klaus Schulze live albums
1993 live albums
Live electronica albums